Bucchi is an Italian surname. Notable people with the surname include:

Cellio Bucchi, Italian film actor
Cristian Bucchi (born 1977), Italian football manager and former forward
Ermocrate Bucchi (1842–1885), Italian painter
Lorenzo Bucchi (born 1983), Italian retired footballer
Massimiano Bucchi (1970), Italian sociologist and writer
Piero Bucchi (born 1958), Italian basketball head coach
Valentino Bucchi (1916–1976), Italian composer

Italian-language surnames